Dipp may refer to:

People
 DIPP (born 1980), Nigerian singer-songwriter
 Hugo Tolentino Dipp (1930–2019), Dominican historian and politician
 Sergio Dipp (born 1988), Mexican sports broadcaster

Other
 Department of Industrial Policy and Promotion
 Devaux's Index of Project Performance